The National Library of Yemen is the national library of Yemen, located in central Sana'a. It is located near the Al-Tahrir Square and the Yemen Military Museum. It has an extensive collection of books in French and in English about Yemen.

References

Buildings and structures in Sanaa
Libraries in Yemen
Yemen